Théa Greboval (born 5 April 1997) is a French footballer who plays as a full back for Division 1 Féminine club Paris FC. She has been a member of the France national team.

Career

Club career 
Théa Greboval evolved in her youth at FC Offranville and a brief stint at FC Dieppe. In 2012, she joined FCF Hénin-Beaumont then in the second division; She made her debut in the first division during the 2013-20141 season. She became an FCF Juvisy player in July 2014.

Selection career 
She has two caps with the France under-17 team between 2013 and 2014, ten caps for the France under-19 team in 2016, and six caps for the France under-20 team in 2016.

Awards 
With the national team, she won the 2016 European Under-19 Championship, and reached the final of the 2016 Under-20 World Cup. She had her first selection for the France team on September 15, 2017 in a friendly against Chile.

Notes

References

External links
 
 

1997 births
Living people
Sportspeople from Dieppe, Seine-Maritime
French women's footballers
Women's association football fullbacks
Division 1 Féminine players
Paris FC (women) players
France women's youth international footballers
France women's international footballers
Footballers from Normandy
FCF Hénin-Beaumont players